Le Bal de Sceaux (The Ball at Sceaux) is the fifth work of Honoré de Balzac, one of the oldest texts of la Comédie Humaine.

The first edition of this novella was published in 1830 by Mame and Delaunay-Vallée in the Scènes de la vie privée (Scenes of Private Life). It was republished in 1835 by Madame Charles-Béchet, in 1839 in the Charpentier edition, and then in 1842 in the first volume of the Furne edition of la Comédie Humaine.

Analysis

In writing this novella Balzac seems to have been inspired by the fables of La Fontaine, especially La fille ("The Girl") and Héron ("The Heron"). There is also an allusion to La Fontaine in the choice of Émilie's surname. The plot is similar to that of another of Balzac's works, La Vieille Fille (The Old Maid), the subject of which hesitates between several suitors and finishes by making do with the only one left.

Plot

After having haughtily refused a number of suitors, under the pretext that they are not peers of France, Émilie de Fontaine falls in love with a mysterious young man who quietly appeared at the village dance at Sceaux. Despite his refined appearance and aristocratic bearing, the unknown (Maximilien Longueville) never tells his identity and seems interested in nobody but his sister, a sickly young girl. But he is not insensible to the attention Émilie gives him and he accepts the invitation of Émilie's father, the Comte de Fontaine. Émilie and Maximilien soon fall in love. The Comte de Fontaine, concerned for his daughter, decides to investigate this mysterious young man, and he discovers him on the Rue du Sentier, a simple cloth merchant, which horrifies Émilie. Piqued, she marries a 72-year-old uncle for his title of Vice Admiral, the Comte de Kergarouët.

Several years after her marriage, Émilie discovers that Maximilien is not a clothier at all, but in fact a Vicomte de Longueville who has become a Peer of France. The young man finally explains why he secretly tended a store: he did it in order to support his family, sacrificing himself for his sick sister and for his brother, who had departed the country.

See also
 Repertory Of The Comedie Humaine

External links

 The Ball at Sceaux at Project Gutenberg
 Original French text of Le Bal de Sceaux

1830 French novels
Books of La Comédie humaine
Novels set in Paris
Novellas by Honoré de Balzac